Samantha Win Tjhia (born March 29, 1991), formerly known as Samantha Jo, is a Canadian actress and former wushu taolu athlete. After her competitive career, she turned to acting and in 2012, she debuted as an actress in the role of Kitana in Mortal Kombat: Legacy, followed by her role as Car-Vex in 2013's Man of Steel. She has appeared in various projects since, including a leading role as Chambers in Zack Snyder's 2021 film, Army of the Dead. In 2021, she will also be starring in Michael Ryan's The Dresden Sun.

Life and career

Early life 
Win was born in Barrie, Ontario, to a Chinese Canadian family. She has trained in martial arts since the age of four as her mother was a black belt in jiu-jitsu herself, doing jiu-jitsu as well before turning to wushu when she turned 12. At this time she also modeled in several children's print ads for Sears Company as well as appeared in various toy commercials. Win then became student of the Sunny Tang Martial Arts Center in Toronto and a member of the Newmarket based Team Ryouko Martial Arts performance team. She was a member of the Canadian National Wushu Team, and was a bronze medalist at the 2007 World Wushu Championships and a double gold-medalist Pan American Wushu Championships. She also competed in the 2008 Beijing Wushu Tournament. She was then recruited as a stuntwoman for Hollywood films because of her extensive training. After moving to Los Angeles, Win continued her education by studying with some of the many great acting teachers and even took to LA theater, performing the role of "Catherine" in Thursday Night Theater Company's production of Arthur Miller's A View from the Bridge. As of 2019, she is living in Los Angeles, United States.

Filmography

Acting credits

Films 
 Man of Steel (2013) as Car-Vex
 Wonder Woman (2017) as Euboea
 Snow Steam Iron (2017) as Lin Woo
 Justice League (2017) as Euboea
 Circle of Stone (2018) as Padilla
 Zack Snyder's Justice League (2021) as Euboea
 Army of the Dead (2021) as Chambers
 The Dresden Sun (post-production) as Z

Television 
 Agent X (2015) (season 1) as Juju Yang
 Warrior (2015) (NBC Pilot) as Amelie
 Lethal Weapon (2019) (season 3) as Eve
 Arrow (2019) (season 7) as Beatrice

Web series 
 Mortal Kombat: Legacy (2011) (season 1) as Kitana
 Mortal Kombat: Legacy II (2013) (season 2) as Kitana

Video games 
 Ninja Gaiden 3 (2012) as Ayane and Momiji (motion capture)
 Resident Evil 6 (2012)
 Call of Duty: Advanced Warfare (2017)

Stunt work

Films 
 The King of Fighters (2010)
 Scott Pilgrim vs. the World (2010)
 In Time (2011)
 Sucker Punch (2011) - for Jena Malone (Rocket)
 Safe (2012)
 The Twilight Saga: Breaking Dawn – Part 2 (2012) - for Kristen Stewart (Bella Swan)
 Man of Steel (2013) - for Antje Traue (Faora)
 300: Rise of an Empire (2014) - for Eva Green (Artemisia)

Television 
 Aaron Stone (2009) (episodes "Saturday Fight Fever" and "Hunt Me? Hunt You!")
 Supah Ninjas (2011) (episode "Morningstar Academy")
 Suburgatory (2013) (episode "Apocalypse Meow")
 Marvel's Agents of S.H.I.E.L.D. (2014)

References

External links
 Samantha Win on Instagram
 Samantha Win on IMDb
Athlete profile at the 2008 Beijing Wushu Tournament

1991 births
Actresses from Ontario
Canadian expatriate actresses in the United States
Canadian jujutsuka
Canadian actresses of Chinese descent
Canadian actresses of Indonesian descent
Canadian stunt performers
Canadian wushu practitioners
Canadian tai chi practitioners
Living people
People from Barrie
Canadian video game actresses
Competitors at the 2008 Beijing Wushu Tournament